Athens City Schools may refer to:
 Athens City Schools (Alabama)
 Athens City Schools (Tennessee)